The list of shipwrecks in 1922 includes ships sunk, foundered, grounded, or otherwise lost during 1922.

January

2 January

3 January

4 January

5 January

6 January

7 January

8 January

11 January

12 January

13 January

16 January

19 January

20 January

22 January

23 January

24 January

25 January

27 January

28 January

29 January

Unknown date

February

1 February

2 February

3 February

4 February

6 February

7 February

8 February

9 February

10 February

14 February

15 February

16 February

18 February

19 February

20 February

21 February

22 February

24 February

25 February

27 February

28 February

Unknown date

March

1 March

2 March

5 March

6 March

7 March

8 March

10 March

12 March

13 March

17 March

18 March

19 March

21 March

23 March

24 March

25 March

27 March

29 March

30 March

31 March

April

3 April

4 April

5 April

7 April

11 April

12 April

13 April

16 April

17 April

18 April

19 April

20 April

21 April

22 April

24 April

25 April

26 April

28 April

29 April

May

1 May

2 May

3 May

5 May

8 May

10 May

15 May

18 May

19 May

20 May

21 May

22 May

23 May

25 May

29 May

30 May

31 May

June

1 June

2 June

3 June

5 June

8 June

10 June

12 June

14 June

16 June

18 June

19 June

23 June

27 June

29 June

Unknown date

July

1 July

3 July

4 July

5 July

6 July

7 July

8 July

10 July

11 July

12 July

13 July

14 July

16 July

17 July

19 July

21 July

23 July

25 July

26 July

27 July

29 July

30 July

31 July

Unknown date

August

1 August

2 August

4 August

5 August

6 August

8 August

9 August

10 August

15 August

16 August

17 August

18 August

20 August

22 August

23 August

24 August

25 August

26 August

28 August

29 August

30 August

31 August

September

1 September

2 September

3 September

4 September

5 September

9 September

11 September

13 September

14 September

15 September

18 September

19 September

20 September

21 September

22 September

23 September

24 September

25 September

26 September

28 September

29 September

October

2 October

3 October

5 October

6 October

7 October

10 October

12 October

15 October

16 October

17 October

18 October

19 October

20 October

21 October

22 October

23 October

24 October

27 October

28 October

29 October

30 October

31 October

November

2 November

3 November

6 November

7 November

9 November

10 November

11 November

12 November

14 November

15 November

17 November

19 November

20 November

22 November

24 November

25 November

27 November

28 November

Unknown date

December

1 December

4 December

6 December

7 December

11 December

13 December

14 December

17 December

18 December

19 December

20 December

21 December

22 December

23 December

24 December

25 December

26 December

27 December

28 December

29 December

30 December

31 December

Unknown date

Unknown date

References

1922
 
Ships